Guilty by Suspicion is a 1991 American period drama film about the Hollywood blacklist, McCarthyism, and the activities of the House Un-American Activities Committee. Written and directed by Irwin Winkler in his directorial debut, it stars Robert De Niro, Annette Bening, and George Wendt. The character of David Merrill was inspired by the experiences of John Berry during the Hollywood blacklist era.

The film was entered into the 1991 Cannes Film Festival.

Plot summary

David Merrill, a successful director in 1950s Hollywood, returns from film-location scouting abroad to find that a rising tide of McCarthyism and the Red Scare is creating havoc among his colleagues in the film industry. His friend Larry Nolan(Chris Cooper) is forced to name people in Hollywood that could have been associated with the communist movement from the FDR/Depression era to the FBI and Congressional Oversight Committee. Much to the anger of his actress wife, Ruth, Nolan names several friends and colleagues such as Merrill as collaborators.

Although most of main characters have tangential relations to the actual United States Communist Party, Washington D.C. forces Hollywood executives such as mogul Darryl Zanuck to convince his directors and support staff to disavow communism and agree to perjure themselves in congressional hearings and name other Hollywood influencers as communists agents.

Merrill is asked by a Hollywood legal consultant, Felix Graff, to cooperate with FBI agents and cite 4 names(including screenwriter childhood friend Bunny Baxter)as the communist sacrifices to Congress.  Only then we he be allowed to work in the film industry. On refusal, Merrill experiences blacklisting by Hollywood and slowly loses all his assets. Over time various friends and associates are ruined by the blacklistings and Joe Lesser sneaks out of the country before he is called up to testify. Unable to pay alimony to his ex-wife, Ruth(Bening) and son, Merrill tries his luck across the country in New York City. He is initially well received by past colleagues but eventually FBI agents convince Merrill's Broadway friends to abandon him as well.

Merrill retreats back to Los Angeles and rekindles his friendship with Ruth while he stays in her apartment. She has since sold her own home and restarted her teaching career in elementary school. Despite losing all his money the family dynamic improves with his constant presence in his son's life. Meanwhile Dorothy Nolan, actress and Larry Nolan's estranged wife has a mental breakdown. Her refusal to cooperate with the FBI has led to her loss of custody of her own son. When she discovers that Merrill could not offer her a job on Broadway since his own dealings with NY producers had failed she becomes distraught and drives her car off a cliff into the Pacific Ocean.

Things begin to improve when Merrill gets a surprise call from B-movie director to pick up the pieces of his failing Western. After successfully improving the film's direction and artistry, once again the FBI track Merrill down and get him removed from the film. Bunny Baxter has also managed to get himself into a situation; In his youth he attended rallies with an attractive girlfriend and did not mention it to the FBI. That has put him in the position of perjury and the inquiry board has threatened extensive jail time unless he also names Hollywood associates as communists. Bunny begs Merrill to allow his name to be "thrown under the bus" since he is "already dead" but Ruth throws him out of the house in disgust.

Merrill decides to contact Zanuck's lawyer, Graff, again after Zanuck begs him to concede to the Congressional requirements to name conspirators in the communist party. Speaking to Graff, it is assumed that Merrill is broken and will cooperate with Congress in Washington D.C. to resurrect his career. At the hearing, under much derision from the Committee, Merrill again backtracks and refuses to discuss anyone outside of himself which causes a fracas in the room. The committee cites him with contempt of Congress which has led to others being sent to prison for years. As he leaves, Bunny takes his place at the witness stand and also refuses to cooperate with the demand that he name his colleagues as conspirators.

Cast

 Robert De Niro as David Merrill
 Annette Bening as Ruth Merrill
 George Wendt as Bunny Baxter
 Patricia Wettig as Dorothy Nolan
 Sam Wanamaker as Felix Graff
 Luke Edwards as Paulie Merrill
 Chris Cooper as Larry Nolan
 Ben Piazza as Darryl F. Zanuck
 Martin Scorsese as Joe Lesser
 Barry Primus as Bert Alan
 Gailard Sartain as Chairman Wood
 Robin Gammell as Congressman Clyde Howard Tavenner
 Brad Sullivan as Congressman Harold H. Velde
 Tom Sizemore as Ray Karlin
 Stuart Margolin as Abe Barron
 Roxann Biggs as Felicia Barron
 Barry Tubb as Jerry Cooper
 Adam Baldwin as FBI Agent #1

Reception
The film opened to positive reviews and earned praise for Robert De Niro's performance. Roger Ebert gave the film three and a half out of four stars and wrote that the film "teaches a lesson we are always in danger of forgetting: that the greatest service we can do our country is to be true to our conscience."

On Rotten Tomatoes, it holds a rating of 67% from 18 reviews.

References

External links
 
 
 
 
 

1991 films
American legal drama films
1991 drama films
1990s legal films
American courtroom films
Films directed by Irwin Winkler
Films about the Hollywood blacklist
Warner Bros. films
Films scored by James Newton Howard
Films set in 1951
1991 directorial debut films
Films produced by Arnon Milchan
1990s English-language films
1990s American films